The 2014–15 Swazi Premier League season was the 2014–15 season of the top level of football competition in Swaziland. It began on 23 August 2014 and concluded on 10 May 2015.

Standings

References

Football leagues in Eswatini
Premier League
Premier League
Swaziland